Donita C. Brady is a cancer biologist and the Presidential Assistant Professor of Cancer Biology at the Perelman School of Medicine at the University of Pennsylvania. Her research examines how cells communicate through kinases and nutrient homeostasis, and in particular, the central role of copper and other metals in these interactions.

Early life and education 
Brady grew up near Virginia Beach and was inspired to purse Chemistry as a result of her AP Chemistry teacher. Brady studied Chemistry at Radford University where she graduated magna cum laude.

Career 
Brady completed a PhD in pharmacology in 2008 at the University of North Carolina, Chapel Hill in the laboratory of Adrienne D. Cox.  As a graduate student, Brady studied how cancer cells exploit normal cellular functions to alter their shape. After graduation, Brady became a postdoctoral fellow (2008 - 2013) and senior research associate (2013 - 2015) in the laboratory of Christopher Counter at Duke University School of Medicine. In 2015, she joined the Department of Cancer Biology in the Perelman School of Medicine at the University of Pennsylvania as an Assistant Professor. In 2016, Brady was recognized as one of 22 Pew Scholars in Biomedical Sciences by The Pew Charitable Trusts. In 2019, Brady was awarded a grant through the Stuart Scott Memorial Cancer Research Fund to continue her work in PDAC (pancreatic ductal adenocarcinoma) research.

Research interests 
Brady research focuses on how cells communicate through kinases and nutrient homeostasis, and the central role of metals such as copper in healthy cell physiology and cancer.  She discovered that kinases require copper for their ability to function. Brady also showed that by inhibiting a protein called CTR1, which is responsible for importing copper into cells, tumor growth could be slowed in a mouse model.

Awards and honors 
Brady has received several honors and awards for her research, including:

 James Lewis Howe Award for Outstanding Achievement in Chemistry - American Chemical Society (2003)
 AACR Annual Meeting Minority Scholar in Cancer Research Award (2013 and 2014)
 CRCHD CURE scholar (2014)
 Pew Scholar in the biomedical sciences (2016)
 JBC/Herb Tabor Young Investigator Award (2016) 
 William Guy Forbeck Research Foundation Scholar (2017)
Linda Pechenik Montague Investigator Award (2018)

Selected publications 
Brady, Donita C., et al. "Copper is required for oncogenic BRAF signalling and tumorigenesis." Nature 509.7501 (2014): 492-496.
Brady, Donita C., et al. "Copper chelation inhibits BRAFV600E-driven melanomagenesis and counters resistance to BRAFV600E and MEK1/2 inhibitors." Cancer research 77.22 (2017): 6240-6252.
Sadeghi, Rochelle Shirin. "Wnt5a Signaling Induced Phosphorylation Increases Acyl Protein Thioesterase Activity And Promotes Melanoma Metastatic Behavior." (2018).
Kim, Ye-Jin, et al. "Copper chaperone ATOX1 is required for MAPK signaling and growth in BRAF mutation-positive melanoma." Metallomics 11.8 (2019): 1430-1440.
Kim, Ye-Jin, et al. "Inhibition of BCL2 family members increases the efficacy of copper chelation in BRAFV600E-driven melanoma." Cancer Research 80.7 (2020): 1387-1400.
Tsang, Tiffany, et al. "Copper is an essential regulator of the autophagic kinases ULK1/2 to drive lung adenocarcinoma." Nature Cell Biology 22.4 (2020): 412-424.

Personal life 
At Radford University, Brady played Division I softball.

External links 

 Brady Lab at the Perelman School of Medicine
 Donita Brady faculty page at the University of Pennsylvania

References 

People from Virginia Beach, Virginia
Radford University alumni
University of North Carolina at Chapel Hill alumni
Perelman School of Medicine at the University of Pennsylvania faculty
Date of birth missing (living people)
Living people
Cancer researchers
African-American women academics
African-American academics
American women academics
Year of birth missing (living people)
21st-century African-American people
21st-century African-American women